Al Dhafra Private Schools are private educational institutions located in the Al Manaseer area of Al Ain and in Mohammed Bin Zayed City, Shabiya 9 in the Emirate of Abu Dhabi, United Arab Emirates. The schools are a Cambridge International Examinations Center, a CITA (Commission on International and Trans-Regional Accreditation, USA) candidate schools and is registered with the United Arab Emirates Ministry of Education.

The schools have more than 2700 students of over 27 nationalities. It was established in 1989.

References

External links
 Al Dhafra Private School's website

Educational institutions established in 1989
Schools in the Emirate of Abu Dhabi
Buildings and structures in Al Ain
Education in Al Ain
Private schools in the United Arab Emirates
Cambridge schools in the United Arab Emirates
1989 establishments in the United Arab Emirates